Lowestoft Town Hall is a municipal building in the High Street, Lowestoft, Suffolk, England. The town hall, which was the meeting place of Lowestoft Council, is a Grade II listed building.

History
The first town hall in the town, which incorporated a chapel for use by parishioners unable to travel to St Margaret's Church, was completed in Market Street 1570. It was substantially rebuilt in 1698 with a corn cross (which indicated the area where markets could be held) on the ground floor, an assembly room on the first floor and a domed ceiling above. It was modified further when the northern part of the ground floor was converted for use as a vestry in 1768. After St Peter's Church was completed in 1832, the building was solely used for non-ecclesiastical purposes.

The current building was designed by John Louth Clemence, built by John Newson and was officially opened on 6 March 1860. The design involved a symmetrical main frontage with seven bays facing onto the High Street; the central section originally featured a porch on the ground floor with a pair of round headed windows on the first floor and a clock tower above. The town clock contained a curfew bell which was cast at John Brand's bell foundry in Norwich for the first own hall in 1644 and was rung each evening at 8 p.m. Internally, the principal rooms were the council chamber and chairman's room on the first floor.

Three stained glass windows, designed by John Thomas and manufactured by James Ballantine of Edinburgh, were installed in the council chamber as a gift from Sir Morton Peto; the largest of the three windows commemorated the Anglo-French alliance against Russia during the Crimean War, while the smaller windows depicted Peto's links to the town.

The building was modified to the designs of William Oldham Chambers in 1872, when the porch was removed so allowing the High Street to be widened. Further reconstruction took place in 1899 when the High Street elevation was re-designed with a new doorway flanked by Corinthian order columns supporting an entablature inscribed with the words "Town Hall". The building was extended to the west along Compass Street in 1905, to the north along the High Street in 1912 and to the west along Mariners Street in 1935.

The town hall was the headquarters of Lowestoft Borough Council for much of the 20th century and continued to serve as the local seat of government when the enlarged Waveney District Council was formed in 1974. Memorials were established in the town hall to commemorate the lives of two local people who were awarded the Victoria Cross. These were Claud Castleton, who earned his award after being killed trying to save the lives of three other soldiers during the Battle of Pozières in July 1916 and Thomas Crisp, who earned his award after being killed during the defence of his vessel, the armed naval smack Nelson, in the North Sea against an attack from a German submarine in August 1917.

The building became vacant and the windows were boarded up after Waveney District Council moved out of the building to share offices with Suffolk County Council at Riverside Road in 2015. Following a report by Colliers International issued in October 2019 setting out options for building, English Heritage recommended in March 2020 that a creative industries hub be established on the site and, in July 2020, Lowestoft Town Council secure a grant from the Architectural Heritage Fund to develop a business plan for such a development.

References

Government buildings completed in 1860
City and town halls in Suffolk
Grade II listed buildings in Suffolk
Lowestoft